The Nakajima–Zwanzig equation (named after the physicists who developed it, Sadao Nakajima and Robert Zwanzig) is an integral equation describing the time evolution of the "relevant" part of a quantum-mechanical system. It is formulated in the density matrix formalism and can be regarded a generalization of the master equation.

The equation belongs to the Mori-Zwanzig formalism within the statistical mechanics of irreversible processes (named after Hazime Mori). By means of a projection operator the dynamics is split into a slow, collective part (relevant part) and a rapidly fluctuating irrelevant part. The goal is to develop dynamical equations for the collective part.

Derivation 
The starting point is the quantum mechanical version of the von Neumann equation, also known as the Liouville equation:
 

The density operator (density matrix)  is split by means of a projection operator

into two parts 
, 
where . The projection operator  selects the aforementioned relevant part from the density operator, for which an equation of motion is to be derived.

The Liouville – von Neumann equation can thus be represented as

The second line is formally solved as

By plugging the solution into the first equation, we obtain the Nakajima–Zwanzig equation:

Under the assumption that the inhomogeneous term vanishes and using

 as well as
 
we obtain the final form

See also 

 Redfield equation

Notes

References 

 E. Fick, G. Sauermann: The Quantum Statistics of Dynamic Processes Springer-Verlag, 1983, .
 Heinz-Peter Breuer, Francesco Petruccione: Theory of Open Quantum Systems. Oxford, 2002  
 Hermann Grabert Projection operator techniques in nonequilibrium statistical mechanics, Springer Tracts in Modern Physics, Band 95, 1982
 R. Kühne, P. Reineker: Nakajima-Zwanzig's generalized master equation: Evaluation of the kernel of the integro-differential equation, Zeitschrift für Physik B (Condensed Matter), Band 31, 1978, S. 105–110,

External links 

Quantum mechanics
Statistical mechanics